The Coalition won the 2019 federal election with a three-seat majority of 77 of 151 lower house seats. Labor holds 68 seats, and crossbenchers hold the remaining six.

Classification of seats as marginal, fairly safe or safe is applied by the independent Australian Electoral Commission using the following definition: "Where a winning party receives less than 56% of the vote, the seat is classified as 'marginal', 56–60% is classified as 'fairly safe' and more than 60% is considered 'safe'."

Pendulum
The Mackerras pendulum was devised by the Australian psephologist Malcolm Mackerras as a way of predicting the outcome of an election contested between two major parties in a Westminster-style lower house legislature such as the Australian House of Representatives, which is composed of single-member electorates and uses a preferential voting system such as a Condorcet method or instant-runoff voting.

The pendulum works by lining up the seats held in Parliament for the government, the opposition and the crossbenches according to the percentage point margin by which they are held on a two-party preferred basis. That is also known as the swing that is required for the seat to change hands. With a uniform swing to the opposition or government parties, the number of seats changing hands can be predicted.

References

Pendulums for Australian federal elections